= Narciso Irala =

Portuguese writer

Narciso Irala Martínez Del Villar (Portugalete, Biscay, Basque Country, Spain , February 7, 1896 – May 13, 1988) was a Spanish Jesuit, psychiatrist and missionary. During his stay in China he described the conditions of suffering that the Chinese were going to war with.

Irala has held several conferences in Brazil.

== Biography ==
In 1913 Irala joined the Society of Jesus and, in the same year, was sent on a mission to Wuhu in China, where he remained for 22 years. Irala was still in Argentina for four years, and because of communism he left China to live in Brazil, where he began to give conferences on psychiatry.

Irala was a speaker in more than 50 countries.

== Work ==
In Portuguese.

- Efficiency without Fatigue, 1969. ISBN 8427102690
- Irala, Narciso (1982). Controle cerebral e emocional (in Brazilian Portuguese). Edicoes Loyola. ISBN 978-85-15-00334-1.
